is the title of a series of unrelated short manga collections by Mitsuru Adachi. Four volumes compile stories selected from shōjo, shōnen, josei and seinen works released from 1985 until 2009.

Volumes

Short Program 
The first collection, titled simply Short Program, collected stories published between 1985 and 1988. In Japan, Shogakukan published this in November 1988. In the United States, Viz Media published this collection in March 2000. The chapters are arranged differently from the Japanese release, for unknown reasons. As was customary with most manga published in the US at the time, the pages were 'flipped' so that they read left to right, rather than right to left as originally drawn. It is also printed at a larger paper size than the now-standard manga size.

Short Program 2 

The second collection, titled Short Program 2, collected stories published between 1988 and 1995. In Japan, Shogakukan published this in June 1996. In the United States, Viz Media published this collection in April 2004. Unlike the first volume, this collection was published right to left, in the now-standard paper size for manga.

Short Program 3
This volume was published in July 2007 in Japan.

Short Program: Girl's Type
This volume was published 11 May 2009 in Japan.

Reception
The Wilamette Week's Jamie Rich called the first volume of Short Program "solid, escapist entertainment" and "as irresistibly infatuating as comic books can get." He described the worlds created by Adachi as "ageless", describing his style as having "crisp, delicate [lines]" and having a "genuine sweetness".

Adaptation

A live-action series with the same name based on the manga was announced on December 13, 2021. The adaptation is produced by Atmovie Inc. and Lapone Entertainment as an 11-episodes anthology television drama, with the members of boy group JO1 alternately playing the male protagonist in each episode. It was premiered on Amazon Prime Video starting March 1, 2022.

References

External links
 あだち充作品 リスト  - Listing of Mitsuru Adachi's short stories
 
 

1988 manga
1996 manga
2007 manga
Manga anthologies
Mitsuru Adachi
Shogakukan manga
Viz Media manga